Bulgurca was a village about 20 km south of Izmir, Turkey. Bulgurca's geographical coordinates are 38° 9' 35" North, 27° 8' 44" East.

History
At a central rural location, Bulgurca was a well catered and popular village with health centre, primary and secondary schools, wide array of shops and trades alongside a strong farming community.

By the end of 1997, Bulgurca was demolished for Tahtali Dam and residents along with those living in nearby villages were relocated to Pancar plains, about 5 km away from the original location.

Bulgurca was also an excavation site: Bakla Tepe.

Notable people

Haris Alexiou, a Greek singer, was a daughter of an Anatolian Greek family who migrated in 1924 from Bulgurca.

Bulgurca in media

A European Union committee of 18 educators visited Bulgurca Primary School.

References

Populated places in İzmir Province
Menderes (Cumaovası) District